Mata Elang International Stadium or MEIS is an indoor arena located at Ancol Dreamland, Jakarta, Indonesia. The venue opened in early 2012 and is located inside Ancol Beach City, a lifestyle and entertainment center. It is one of the biggest indoor arenas in Southeast Asia.

Due to a conflict between Mata Elang management and Ancol Beach City management, MEIS was closed on 26 June 2014 until further announcement. Henry Yosodiningrat, one of the owners of the arena, said the venue's lease will end in March 2037. The venue did, however, reopen in fall 2022 with a new name: Beach City International stadium.

Linda C Banowati, Operational Director of Mata Elang management, said they are in the process of building two new stadiums outside Ancol Beach City. One will be located in Jakarta, and one in Bali. Both of these new stadiums are expected to be finished in 2017.

Notable concerts

See also 
 List of indoor arenas
 Istora Senayan
 The BritAma Arena
 DBL Arena
 Palembang Sport and Convention Center

References

External links 

 News about MEIS
 Ancol Beach City

Buildings and structures in Jakarta
Tourist attractions in Jakarta
Music venues in Indonesia
Convention centres in Indonesia